Nurudin N. Mukhitdinov (born 18 March 1959, in Kurgan-Tyube) is a Tajikistani politician.  Minister of Posts and Telecommunications of Tajikistan from 1995 to 2003, he is the Regional Commonwealth in the Field of Communications (RCC) Executive Committee Director General.

Nukhitdinov graduated from the Tashkent Electrotechnical Communications Institute in 1981 and became an, engineer in the Technical Division of the Electrotecnical Communications Administration. After serving in various executive positions between 1987 and 1995 he was appointed Minister of Post and Telecommunications of Tajikistan (often referred to as Minister of Communications) in July 1995, a position he held until 2003. In 2003 he was elected to the office of the RCC as Executive Committee Director General by the Communications Administrations of the Russian Federation and the Republic of Tajikistan, and was reelected in 2007, and evidently again in 2011.

Mukhitdinov holds the degree of Candidate of Sciences (economics).

References

Living people
1959 births
Communication ministers of Tajikistan